ApplyBoard is a Canadian Educational technology company founded in 2015 in Waterloo, Ontario, Canada. It offers an artificial intelligence recruitment platform that helps international students apply for post-secondary studies abroad. In 2019, Deloitte recognized ApplyBoard as Canada's fastest-growing tech company. After its Series D round of C$375 million, led by Ontario Teachers Pension Plan in June 2021, ApplyBoard now has a current value of more than C$4 billion.

History
ApplyBoard was founded by three brothers Martin Basiri, Massi Basiri and Meti Basiri. Martin, originally from Iran, faced challenges while applying to study in Canada to complete a Masters Degree in his attempts to navigate the complex application process. He would go on to complete his degree and also assist his brothers to do the same. In 2015, they decided to quit their jobs and start the company to make education more accessible for international students.

Series A 
In 2018, the company maintained partnerships with 750 high schools, colleges and universities in Canada and the U.S. That same year the company raised C$17 Million in Series A funding, led by Silicon Valley-based Artiman Ventures, with earlier investors 500 Startups, Candou Ventures, Think+ and others also taking part in the round.

Series B 
In 2019, the company had 170 employees and partnerships with 1,200 secondary and post-secondary institutions in North America. In May 2019, the company raised C$55 million in Series B funding lead by Anthos Capital, with earlier investor Artiman ventures. The company's platform had cumulatively been used by 45,000 international students at the time of this funding round.

This year the company also moved its headquarters to its current location in Kitchener, Ontario to make room for its growing workforce that numbered only 172 at the time.

In 2020, the company had 500 employees and expanded its partnership with secondary and post-secondary institutions in United Kingdom. In February 2020, Jo Johnson, the former Minister of State for Universities, Science, Research and Innovation of the United Kingdom,  joined the company as the chairman of the Advisory Board.

Series C 
In May 2020, the company raised C$75 million at a C$1.4 billion valuation led by Drive Capital along with Fidelity Investments Canada ULC and Business Development Bank of Canada, with earlier investors Anthos Capital, Artiman Ventures, Garage Capital and Plug and Play Tech Center. In September 2020, the company raised an additional C$70 Million in Series C extension with participation from ETS, Index Ventures, Blue Cloud Ventures, Harmonic Growth Partners, and additional investors. In October 2020, the company announced a partnership with Times Higher Education to better support prospective international students during their search journey.

Series D 
On June 15, 2021, ApplyBoard announced its Series D funding round of C$375 million and a new valuation of C$4 billion. The round was led by Ontario Teachers’ Pension Plan along with existing investors Fidelity Management & Research Company LLC, BDC, Harmonic, Index Ventures, Blue Cloud Ventures, and Garage Capital.

Co-Founder and CEO, Martin Basiri stated in multiple interviews that the funds would be used “to expand its team, support its recent expansion to Australia, the United States (US), and the United Kingdom (UK), and develop its technology.”

It was later announced in a separate release that Quebec institutional investor Caisse de dépôt et placement du Québec (CDPQ) also joined the round as part of its Equity 253 fund.

Products and Services

Application Platform 
ApplyBoard is centred around its application platform that has a listing of more than 1,500 colleges, universities, and K-12 schools in Canada, the United States, the United Kingdom, and Australia. Schools have a listing of their institutional details, programs, and application information. International students and recruitment partners, often called agents, then apply directly through the ApplyBoard platform to these programs.

The platform reportedly helps guide applications using backend machine learning and artificial intelligence. ApplyBoard claims to have an acceptance rate of 95% for its international students using its platform.

ApplyProof 
In October 2019, ApplyBoard launched a secondary technology platform called ApplyProof that supports peer-to-peer verification of Letters of Acceptance (LoA) from a university. The aim being to establish trust in the documents being shared with immigration and visa officials.

The offerings from ApplyProof were expanded in May 2021 to include verification of English language proficiency tests through separate partnerships with IELTS and Pearson Education who administer TOEFL and PTE scores, respectively.

Awards and recognition 
ApplyBoard was named Canada’s fastest growing technology company in 2019 by Deloitte as it ranked #1 on the accounting firm’s Fast 50 list. ApplyBoard would go onto make Deloitte’s Fast 50 in 2020 by ranking #2 in Canada and #14 in North America. 

In December 2019, Meti and Massi Basiri (Co-Founders & CMO and COO, respectively), were named to Forbes’ Top 30 Under 30 list for the categories of Education, Immigrants, and Big Money. 

ApplyBoard was named to LinkedIn’s list of Top Startups in Canada for 2020 that recognizes Canada’s top private companies that have remained “resilient during a tumultuous time, continuing to attract investment, employees and attention.”

Additional lists of recognition that ApplyBoard has been named to include the 2021 Narwhal List of private Canadian technology companies best poised to become world class firms, TechTO’s list of Top Canadian Rocketships to grow your career, the CIX Top 10 in September 2019, and in 2020, ApplyBoard was named as part of GSV’s Global EdTech 50 recognizing the 50 most transformational growth companies in education technology.

References

External links
 

Canadian companies established in 2015
2015 establishments in Ontario
Software companies established in 2015
Software companies of Canada
Educational technology companies
Educational technology companies of Canada